René Ferrero (12 October 1926, Saint-Fons – 11 January 1999, Bron) was a French rugby league footballer. He played as prop.

Career
Ferrero notably played for Marseille XIII and won the Lord Derby Cup in 1957. With his club performances, he was capped four times for the France national team in 1957, contending also the 1957 Rugby League World Cup, where he was called up alongside his teammate Antranick Apellian.

Honours

Rugby league
Champion of the Lord Derby Cup: 1957 (Marseille)
Runner up at the French Rugby League Championship: 1954 (Marseille)
Runner-up at the Lord Derby Cup: 1955 (Marseille)

References

External links
René Ferrero profile at rugbyleagueproject.com

1926 births
1999 deaths
Marseille XIII players
Rugby league props
French rugby league players
Sportspeople from Lyon Metropolis
France national rugby league team players